is a former Japanese football player.

Playing career
Fukushima was born in Kanagawa Prefecture on August 1, 1977. After graduating from Chuo University, he joined the J2 League club Ventforet Kofu in 2000. Although he played in several matches as a substitute forward, he retired at the end of the 2000 season.

Club statistics

References

External links

1977 births
Living people
Chuo University alumni
Association football people from Kanagawa Prefecture
Japanese footballers
J2 League players
Ventforet Kofu players
Association football forwards